The Vought VE-7 "Bluebird" was an early biplane of the United States. First flying in 1917, it was designed as a two-seat trainer for the United States Army, then adopted by the United States Navy as its first fighter aircraft. In 1922, a VE-7 became the first airplane to take off from an American aircraft carrier.

Design and development
The Lewis & Vought Corporation was formed just months after the U.S. entered World War I, with the intention of servicing war needs. The company's trainer was patterned after successful European designs; for instance, the engine was a Wright Hispano Suiza of the type used by the French Spads. In practice, the VE-7's performance was much better than usual for a trainer, and the Army ordered 1,000 of an improved design called the VE-8. However, the contract was cancelled due to the end of the war.

However, the Navy was very interested in the VE-7, and received the first machine in May 1920. Production orders soon followed, and in accordance to Navy policy at the time, examples were also built by the Naval Aircraft Factory. In all, 128 VE-7s were built.

The fighter version of the VE-7 was designated VE-7S. It was a single-seater, the front cockpit being faired over and a  Vickers machine gun mounted over it on the left side and synchronized to fire through the propeller. Some planes, designated VE-7SF, had flotation gear consisting of inflatable bags stowed away, available to help keep the plane afloat when ditching at sea.

The Bluebird won the 1918 Army competition for advanced training machines.

The VE-8 variant completed in July 1919 had a 340hp Wright-Hispano H engine, reduced overall dimensions, increased wing area, a shorter faired cabane, and two Vickers guns. Two were completed. Flight test results were disappointing, the aircraft was overweight, with heavy controls, inadequate stability and sluggish performance.

The VE-9 variant, first delivered to the Navy on 24 June 1922, was essentially an improved VE-7, with most of the improvements in the fuel system area. Four of the 21 ordered by the U.S. Navy were unarmed observation float seaplanes for battleship catapult use.

Operational history

The VE-7s equipped the Navy's first two fighter squadrons VF-1 and VF-2. A VE-7 flown by Lieutenant Virgil C. Griffin made history on October 17, 1922 when it took off from the deck of the newly commissioned carrier . The VE-7s were the Navy's frontline fighters for several years, with three still assigned to the Langley in 1927; all were retired the following year.

Variants

VE-7 (1918) - 14 built for the U.S. Army Air Service; 39 built for the U.S. Navy; (one of two known, built at McCook Field. Reportedly four more were built by Springfield Co)
VE-7F (1921) - 29 built for the U.S. Navy
VE-7G (1921) - One converted from VE-7 for U.S. Marine Corps, 23 converted from VE-7 for U.S. Navy
VE-7GF (1921) - One converted from VE-7
VE-7H (1924) - Nine observation seaplanes built for the U.S. Navy
VE-7S (1925) - One converted from VE-7
VE-7SF (1925) - 11 built for the U.S. Navy
VE-7SH - One VE-7SF converted into a floatplane.
VE-9 (1927) - 22 built for the U.S. Army, 17 built for the U.S. Navy. (U.S. Army used same designation as U.S. Navy)
VE-9H (1927) - Four unarmed observation float seaplanes built for the U.S. Navy battleships, modified vertical tail surfaces for improved catapult and water stability
VE-9W - canceled

Surviving aircraft
No survivors remain, however a replica Bluebird was completed in early 2007 by volunteers of the Vought Aircraft Heritage Foundation. It is now on display at the National Naval Aviation Museum in Pensacola, Florida.

Operators

United States Army Air Service
United States Navy

Specifications (VE-7)

References

Notes

Bibliography

K.O. Eckland's Aerofiles; accessed 13 May 2007

External links

Vought Aircraft Industries Inc. Company Heritage

V-007
Military aircraft of World War I
VE-7, Vought
Single-engined tractor aircraft
Biplanes
Carrier-based aircraft
Aircraft first flown in 1917